Doris E. Saunders (August 8, 1921 –  March 24, 2014) was an American librarian, author, editor, businesswoman, and professor of Journalism. She started her career as Johnson Publishing Company librarian and then became head of the Johnson Publishing Company Books Division. Later in life, Saunders founded Ancestor Hunting, a genealogy research company, and wrote its publication, "Kith and Kin: Focus on Families." She was also Professor of Journalism and Chairwoman of the Department of Mass Communication at Jackson State University. After her retirement from Jackson State, Saunders continued to work with the Books Division at Johnson Publishing.

Early years and education
Doris Evans was born on August 8, 1921 in Chicago, Illinois, to Thelma Rice and John Alvesta Stewart Evans. She attended Englewood High School in Chicago from 1934 to 1938. Her father died in 1935. After his death, Saunders and her family moved in with her maternal grandmother and step-grandfather on South Lafayette Avenue.

Saunders entered Northwestern University in 1938 and remained until 1939. She then briefly pursued studies at Central YMCA College in Chicago (now Roosevelt University) from 1939-1941. Also, in 1941, she entered the Chicago Public Library Training Class and completed the course of study and practice in 1942. In May 1942, she became a Junior Library Assistant and shortly thereafter she passed the Civil Service examination for Senior Library Assistant. She was first assigned to the Book Selection Department, and later transferred to the Hill Branch Library, and then to the George M. Pullman Branch Library. While at Pullman, Saunders was appointed the first African American reference librarian to work in the Social Science and Business Division of the main library. Between 1947 and 1951 she again attended Roosevelt University completing a Bachelor of Arts degree in Philosophy.

In 1976, after Saunders' children had completed college, she went to Boston University and completed a Master of Science in Journalism from the School of Public Communication and the Master of Arts in Afro-American Studies from the graduate school in one year. These degrees were awarded in 1977. From 1983 to 1984 she studied toward a Ph.D. in history at Vanderbilt University in Nashville, Tennessee.  At the same time, she commuted to Chicago on weekends to continue work on the books in progress at Johnson Publishing Company.

Saunders was involved in many organizations. She served as a board member of the Black Academy of Arts and Letters, board member of the American Civil Liberties Union Illinois Chapter, member of the Chicago Leadership Resource Program, National Association of Media Women, Chicago Publicity Club, Alpha Gamma Pi Sorority, and Black Advisory Commission for the 1980 census in Washington, D.C.

The Doris E. Saunders Papers are located at the Vivian G. Harsh Research Collection of Afro-American History and Literature in Chicago, Illinois.

Johnson Publishing Company
In January 1949 Saunders wrote a letter to John H. Johnson, who had just purchased a building that he was renovating for Ebony magazine offices. She suggested that he establish a special library for his editorial and advertising staff and clients. Saunders envisioned the library would document African American experience in the United States and provide demographic data the would facilitate the efforts of the advertising department as they sought to build advertising and advertising revenue. Saunders was quickly called in for an interview and on February 1, 1949 she became responsible for starting the library at Johnson Publishing Company. She was promoted to the director of the company's Book Publishing Division between 1960 and 1961.

During her time at Johnson Publishing, Saunders co authored Black Society with Geri Major 1976 and edit  over 20 books, including, Burn Killer Burn (1962)  Before The Mayflower (1962) The Day They Marched (1963) and The Kennedy Years and the Negro (1964). She compiled Negro Handbook (1966) Ebony HandBook (1974) Du Bois : A Pictorial Biography (1978) and Special Moments in African-American History, 1955-1996: The Photographs of Moneta Sleet, Jr. (1998).

Women's Institute for Freedom of the Press
In 1977, Saunders became an associate of the Women's Institute for Freedom of the Press (WIFP). WIFP is an American nonprofit publishing organization. The organization works to increase communication between women and connect the public with forms of women-based media.

Ancestor Hunting
Saunders founded Ancestor Hunting with her children and grandchildren in 1982. The company focused on genealogical research and published the newsletter Kith and Kin: Focus on Families. Throughout the 1980s, Saunders traveled speaking regularly to genealogy conventions and groups to promote her business, publications and to encourage documenting one's family history. Her goal was to make genealogy accessible to all people, especially African-Americans.

Jackson State University
Saunders began working at Jackson State University in Jackson, Mississippi in January 1978 for a one-semester writer-in-residence position. In the same year, she left Johnson Publishing Company and accepted the position of Professor and Coordinator of Print Journalism at Jackson State University. She was Professor and Chair of the Department of Mass Communications at Jackson State University until retiring in 1996.

References

External links
 Chicago Collections Consortium, Doris E. Saunders Papers
 Selected Readings
 http://search.library.wisc.edu/catalog/ocm12857126
 http://businessprofiles.com/details/ancestor-hunting-inc/IL-52818958

African-American businesspeople
American businesspeople
African-American journalists
American women journalists
African-American librarians
American librarians
American women librarians
Johnson Publishing Company
Writers from Chicago
Roosevelt University alumni
Northwestern University alumni
Boston University College of Communication alumni
Vanderbilt University alumni
1921 births
2014 deaths